Powerless is a six-issue comic book limited series published by Marvel Comics which ran from 2004 to 2005. The series was written by Matt Cherniss and Peter Johnson and penciled by artist Michael Gaydos.

Plot summary
A psychologist named William Watts wakes up in a hospital after a three-day coma. Fresh in his mind is the world of Earth-616, which he experienced while asleep. As William returns to his mundane daily life, he encounters three familiar faces: Peter Parker, a high-school student who is pressured by Norman Osborn to conduct industrial espionage on Stark Industries; a blind lawyer, Matt Murdock, who battles an uphill case against the Kingpin to absolve Frank Castle of murder; and an amnesiac soldier named Logan, who is led to believe he murdered Charles Xavier. Inspired by Matt's conviction, William leaves his bystander position and begins to act to help the three: he helps reveal Charles' murder was done by a third party, citing Logan to investigate Eric Magnus; he convinces Frank Castle to reveal vital information to Matt's case; and he acts by calling the cops to assist Peter in arresting Osborn. After Frank's trial, the Kingpin murders Murdock. Castle assassinates Kingpin in retaliation, which places him on the road to becoming the real-life Punisher. The series ends with William contemplating how the coma has shaken him from the stupor of life, as he reflects on his coma identity as Uatu.

Creators
Matt Cherniss and Peter Johnson – writers
Michael Gaydos – penciller
Lee Loughridge – colorist
Alex Maleev – cover artist
Axel Alonso – editor
Joe Quesada – Editor-in-Chief

Collections

References

2004 comics debuts
2005 comics debuts
Marvel Comics titles